Murder C.O.D. is a 1990 American made-for-television crime drama film directed by Alan Metzger starring Patrick Duffy and William Devane based on the Barbara Paul novel Kill Fee.

The movie was filmed in Portland, Oregon in May 1990, including on the South Park Blocks.

Plot summary 
Police officer Steve Murtaugh is blackmailed for having an extramarital affair. Moving with his wife from Chicago to Portland Oregon, the blackmailer follows.

Cast 
Patrick Duffy as Steve Murtaugh
Chelsea Field as Ellie
Alex Hyde-White as Corbin
Harris Laskaway as Jerry Walsh
Janet Margolin as Maye Walsh
Allan Miller as Leon Walsh
Charlie Robinson as Lt. Silk
Mariette Hartley as Sally Kramer
William Devane as Alex Brandt

References

1990 television films
1990 films
Films based on American novels
1990 crime drama films
American crime drama films
Films scored by Fred Karlin
Films shot in Portland, Oregon
NBC network original films
Films directed by Alan Metzger
American drama television films
1990s English-language films
1990s American films